Glenlusk is a rural locality in the local government areas (LGA) of Derwent Valley (6%) and Glenorchy (94%) in the South-east and Hobart LGA regions of Tasmania. The 2016 census recorded a population of 200 for the state suburb of Glenlusk.
It is a semi-rural suburb of Hobart. It is west of Chigwell.

History 
Glenlusk was gazetted as a locality in 1961.

Geography
Sorell Creek forms part of the western boundary. Most of the boundaries are survey lines or ridge lines.

Road infrastructure 
Route C615 (Glenlusk Road / Molesworth Road) runs through from east to west after following the eastern boundary for a short distance.

References

Towns in Tasmania
Localities of Derwent Valley Council
Localities of City of Glenorchy